Don't Forget to Remember is the fourth album by the English alternative rock band Puressence which was released on 24 September 2007.

Track listing
"Moonbeam" - 3:53
"Don't Forget to Remember" - 5:03
"Drop Down to Earth" - 3:11
"Don't Know Any Better" - 3:31
"Life Comes Down Hard" - 3:25
"Bitter Pill" - 5:30
"Brainwaves" - 4:14
"Palisades" - 3:53
"Sold Unseen" - 3:47
"Burns Inside" - 4:27

Personnel

Musicians
James Mudriczki - vocals
Lowell Killen - guitar
Kevin Matthews - bass
Anthony Szuminski - drums

References

External links
Album review by UKEvents.net

2007 albums
Puressence albums